Beauclair is a commune in the Meuse department in the Grand Est region in northeastern France.

Population

In popular culture
In the Blood and Wine expansion to the critically acclaimed 2015 game The Witcher 3: Wild Hunt, the capital of the fictional duchy of Toussaint is named after the real town of Beauclair. Several references pay homage to the town and the region, like its wine-making tradition and mention to a fictional brand of wine named Est-Est.

See also
Communes of the Meuse department

References

Communes of Meuse (department)